Sofia Sforza (born 22 July 1995) is an Italian ice dancer. With former partner Francesco Fioretti, she placed as high as 10th at the World Junior Championships.

Career 
Sofia Sforza competed with Daniel Ferrari early in her career. She teamed up with Francesco Fioretti in December 2008. They were coached by Valter Rizzo mainly in Zanica. On 1 October 2013, it was reported that Sforza/Fioretti had parted ways and she had teamed up with her brother, Leo Luca Sforza, who was until then a pair skater.

Programs 
(with Sforza)

(with Fioretti)

Competitive highlights

With Leo Luca Sforza

With Francesco Fioretti

With Daniel Ferarri

References

External links 

 
 

Italian female ice dancers
1995 births
Living people
Sportspeople from the Province of Bergamo
20th-century Italian women
21st-century Italian women